Cesare II Gonzaga (Mantua, 1592 – 26 February 1632) was Duke of Guastalla.

He was the son of Ferrante II Gonzaga, Duke of Guastalla and Duke of Amalfi and of Vittoria Doria.
He succeeded his father in 1630, but died 2 years later.

From 1630 to 1632 he was General Commissar in Italy for Ferdinand II.

He married in 1612 with Isabella Orsini (1598–1623),and had 2 children :
 Ferrante III Gonzaga (1618–1678), next Duke of Guastalla.
 Vespasiano Vincenzo Gonzaga, (1621–1687), Viceroy of Valencia, married María Inés Manrique de Lara, daughter and heiress of Manuel 9th Count of Prades de Nava

References

Sources 
 

1592 births
1632 deaths
Cesare 2
Cesare 2
16th-century Italian nobility
17th-century Italian nobility